The Airman's Creed is a creed for members of the U.S. Air Force. It was introduced in 2007 by General T. Michael Moseley, Chief of Staff of the U.S. Air Force.  In a letter introducing the creed, Moseley wrote that one of his "top priorities" was to "reinvigorate the warrior ethos in every Airman of our Total Force."  Thus, the intent of the creed was to enhance the building of a warrior ethos among its Airmen and to provide Airmen a tangible statement of beliefs.   

The Airman's Creed helps establish a coherent bond between the members of the USAF. The creed is fueled by the Air Force's heritage and, in the words of Moseley, "the warfighting-focused culture, conviction, character, ethic, mindset, spirit and soul we foster in all Airmen".
 
This creed supplanted all other prior creeds that the Air Force had been using, including the NCO Creed, SNCO Creed, the Chief's creed, and the First Sergeant's Creed.

The Airman's Creed

References

See also
Soldier's Creed
Quartermaster Creed
Ranger Creed
Rifleman's Creed (USMC)
Sailor's Creed
Creed of the United States Coast Guardsman
Noncommissioned officer's creed

United States Air Force
2007 documents
Warrior code